Deree College is a private, non-profit, liberal arts college, in Athens, Greece. Its 64-acre main campus is located in the northeastern Athenian suburb of Agia Paraskevi.

Deree College is a division of the Boston-based not-for-profit organization American College of Greece. It is fully accredited by the New England Association of Schools and Colleges and also has a degree validation agreement with the Open University of the United Kingdom. Deree offers bachelor's degrees in business, the liberal arts and sciences and the fine and performing arts and master's degrees in communication and psychology. Deree College does not offer doctorates. 

Deree College is not a state-accredited University or Higher Education Institution (HEI). In Greece, Deree College is officially referred to as "εκπαιδευτικός φορέας μη τυπικής μεταλυκειακής εκπαίδευσης" without degree awarding powers because of Artcle 16. However, the Deree College undergraduate programmes related to degrees validated and issued by the Open University of the United Kingdom are recognised by the Hellenic Republic.

History

When the American College of Greece was founded in Smyrna, Asia Minor, it was initially an all-girls secondary school. On 1885, it became an institution of higher education, the predecessor of today's Deree College.

Deree College was shut down in 1922 during the mass immigration of Greeks from Asia Minor following the Asia Minor Disaster in the aftermath of World War I. On 1923, Prime Minister Eleftherios Venizelos invited Deree to reopen in Athens. It did so that same year and survived the World War II Nazi occupation of the country.

In the 1970s, the undergraduate division of the American College of Greece was renamed Deree College in honor of William Deree, a wealthy Greek American philanthropist from Chicago.

Academics

Deree has been accredited by the New England Association of Schools and Colleges (NEASC) since 1981. Its degrees are equivalent to degrees issued by US colleges and universities. Deree has a 64-acre campus in Agia Paraskevi, a suburb of Athens 6 miles from the center. Deree College - The American College of Greece offers 21 undergraduate majors leading to BA or BS degrees, and 8 graduate specialties leading to MA or MS degrees. It also offers many graduate diplomas, certificates and continuing education courses.

Notable alumni
 Kostas Karamanlis former Prime Minister of Greece.
 Notis Mitarachi, EL Politician, Minister of Migration & Asylum (2020) of the Hellenic Republic, MP of the Hellenic Parliament, ex President of the Council of the European Union (Foreign Affairs - Trade) during the Hellenic Presidency, ex Deputy Minister for Economic Development and Competitiveness.

References

External links
 Official College Website
 Official College Facebook Page
 College Study Abroad and International Facebook Page

Private universities and colleges in Greece
Agia Paraskevi
Buildings and structures in North Athens
Universities and colleges in Attica